"Vitaphone" can refer to:

Vitaphone – a sound-on-disc system for films, used in the 1920s
Vitaphone GmbH – a German telecommunications company which supplies hospitals
Vitaphone Racing – a German racing team sponsored by Vitaphone GmbH